The Herbert family is an Anglo-Welsh noble family founded by William Herbert, known as "Black William", the son of William ap Thomas, founder of Raglan Castle, a follower of Edward IV of England in the Wars of the Roses. The name Herbert originated in 1461 when William was granted the title Baron Herbert of Raglan, having assumed an English-style surname in place of his Welsh patronymic, ap William.

Notable members
George Herbert, poet.
Edward Herbert, 1st Baron Herbert of Chirbury, poet.
William Herbert, 3rd Earl of Pembroke, founded Pembroke College, Oxford, and sponsored the printing of the First Folio of William Shakespeare's plays.
Arthur Herbert, 1st Earl of Torrington took the Invitation to William to The Hague, disguised as a simple sailor, and commanded William's invasion fleet during the Glorious Revolution which ousted James II.
Philip Herbert, 4th Earl of Pembroke, Chancellor of the University of Oxford.
George Herbert, 5th Earl of Carnarvon, financial backer of the search for and the excavation of Tutankhamun's tomb in the Valley of the Kings.

Lineage

 William ap Thomas
 William Herbert, 1st Earl of Pembroke (1423–1469) 
 William Herbert, 2nd Earl of Pembroke
 Elizabeth Herbert, 3rd Baroness Herbert, m. Charles Somerset, j.u. Baron Herbert then 1st Earl of Worcester. 
 Henry Somerset, 2nd Earl of Worcester, 4th Baron Herbert
 William Somerset, 3rd Earl of Worcester, 5th Baron Herbert
 Edward Somerset, 4th Earl of Worcester, 6th Baron Herbert  
 Henry Somerset, 1st Marquess of Worcester, 7th Baron Herbert
 Edward Somerset, 2nd Marquess of Worcester, 8th Baron Herbert
 Henry Somerset, 1st Duke of Beaufort, 9th Baron Herbert  
 Charles Somerset, Marquess of Worcester (styled Lord Herbert 1667-1682)
 Henry Somerset, 2nd Duke of Beaufort, 10th Baron Herbert
 Henry Scudamore, 3rd Duke of Beaufort, 11th Baron Herbert
 Charles Somerset, 4th Duke of Beaufort, 12th Baron Herbert
 Henry Somerset, 5th Duke of Beaufort, 13th Baron Herbert
 Henry Somerset, 6th Duke of Beaufort, 14th Baron Herbert
 Henry Somerset, 7th Duke of Beaufort, 15th Baron Herbert
 Henry Somerset, 8th Duke of Beaufort, 16th Baron Herbert
 Henry Somerset, 9th Duke of Beaufort, 17th Baron Herbert
 Henry Somerset, 10th Duke of Beaufort, 18th Baron Herbert
 Lady Blanche Somerset, m. John Eliot, 6th Earl of St Germans
 Lady Cathleen Eliot, m. John Seyfried
 David Seyfried Herbert, 19th Baron Herbert
 Sir Richard Herbert, an illegitimate son of William Herbert, 1st Earl of Pembroke (1423-1469) (above) 
 William Herbert, 1st Earl of Pembroke (1501–1570)
 Henry Herbert, 2nd Earl of Pembroke
 William Herbert, 3rd Earl of Pembroke
 Philip Herbert, 4th Earl of Pembroke
 Philip Herbert, 5th Earl of Pembroke
 William Herbert, 6th Earl of Pembroke
 Philip Herbert, 7th Earl of Pembroke
 Thomas Herbert, 8th Earl of Pembroke
 Henry Herbert, 9th Earl of Pembroke
 Henry Herbert, 10th Earl of Pembroke, m. Lady Elizabeth Spencer
 George Herbert, 11th Earl of Pembroke
 Robert Herbert, 12th Earl of Pembroke
 Sidney Herbert, 1st Baron Herbert of Lea, m. Elizabeth Ashe à Court-Repington
 George Herbert, 13th Earl of Pembroke
 Sidney Herbert, 14th Earl of Pembroke
 Reginald Herbert, 15th Earl of Pembroke
 Sidney Herbert, 16th Earl of Pembroke
 Henry Herbert, 17th Earl of Pembroke
 William Herbert, 18th Earl of Pembroke
 Lady Emma Herbert
 Sir George Herbert, 1st Baronet
 Michael Henry Herbert
 Sir Sidney Herbert, 1st Baronet
 Lady Catherine Herbert
 William Herbert
 Henry Herbert, 1st Earl of Carnarvon 
 Henry Herbert, 2nd Earl of Carnarvon
 Henry Herbert, 3rd Earl of Carnarvon
 Henry Herbert, 4th Earl of Carnarvon
 George Herbert, 5th Earl of Carnarvon
 Henry Herbert, 6th Earl of Carnarvon
 Henry Herbert, 7th Earl of Carnarvon
 George Herbert, 8th Earl of Carnarvon
 Aubrey Herbert
 Auberon Herbert (landowner)
 Auberon Herbert
 Auberon Herbert, 9th Baron Lucas
 Charles Herbert (Royal Navy officer)
 William Herbert (botanist)
 Henry William Herbert
 Algernon Herbert
 Robert Herbert
 William Herbert (died 1646)
 James Herbert (died 1677)
 James Herbert (1660–1704)
 James Herbert (died 1740)
 Philip Herbert (died 1749)
 Philip Herbert (died 1716)
 John Herbert (died 1659)
 Sir Edward Herbert
 William Herbert, 1st Baron Powis
 Percy Herbert, 2nd Baron Powis
 William Herbert, 1st Marquess of Powis
 William Herbert, 2nd Marquess of Powis
 William Herbert, 3rd Marquess of Powis
 Lord Edward Herbert
 Barbara Herbert, m. Henry Herbert, 1st Earl of Powis (below)
 Richard Herbert of Coldbrook
 Sir Richard Herbert
 Sir Edward Herbert
 Richard Herbert, Lord of Cherbury
 Edward Herbert, 1st Baron Herbert of Chirbury
 Richard Herbert, 2nd Baron Herbert of Chirbury
 Edward Herbert, 3rd Baron Herbert of Chirbury
 Henry Herbert, 4th Baron Herbert of Chirbury
 Florence Herbert, m. Richard Herbert (below)
 George Herbert
 Henry Herbert (Master of the Revels)
 Henry Herbert, 1st Baron Herbert of Chirbury
 Henry Herbert, 2nd Baron Herbert of Chirbury
 Thomas Herbert (seaman)
 Mathew Herbert
 Francis Herbert
 Sir Matthew Herbert, 1st Baronet
 Richard Herbert, m. Florence Herbert (above)
 Francis Herbert
 Henry Herbert, 1st Earl of Powis, m. Barbara Herbert (above)
 George Herbert, 2nd Earl of Powis
 Lady Henrietta Herbert, m. Edward Clive, 1st Earl of Powis
 Edward Herbert, 2nd Earl of Powis  
 Edward Herbert, 3rd Earl of Powis
 Percy Egerton Herbert
 George Herbert, 4th Earl of Powis, m. Violet Lane-Fox, 16th Baroness Darcy de Knayth
 Mervyn Herbert, 17th Baron Darcy de Knayth
 Davina Herbert, 18th Baroness Darcy de Knayth
 George Herbert (priest)
 Robert Charles Herbert
 Edward William Herbert
 Edward Herbert, 5th Earl of Powis
 Christian Herbert, 6th Earl of Powis
 William Henry Herbert
 Percy Herbert (bishop)
 George Herbert, 7th Earl of Powis
 John Herbert, 8th Earl of Powis
 Robert Clive (1789–1854), ancestor of Windsor-Clive family
 Charles Herbert
 Edward Herbert (attorney-general)
 Arthur Herbert, 1st Earl of Torrington
 Edward Herbert (judge)

References

 
British families